The following lists events that happened during 2015 in the Republic of Cyprus.

Incumbents 

 President: Nicos Anastasiades
 President of the Parliament: Yiannakis Omirou

Events
Ongoing – Cyprus dispute

January 
 3 January – The Cypriot-registered cargo ship MV Cemfjord sinks off the northern coast of Scotland leaving the eight people on board missing.

February 
 11 February – The Greek Coast Guard rescues all 22 crewmen from a Cyprus-flagged vessel Good Faith that ran aground on the Greek island of Andros during a storm in the Aegean Sea.

March 
 13 March – Politicians in Cyprus demand the resignation of the governor of the central bank there, Chrystalla Georghadji, raising concerns about a conflict of interest.

April 
 2 April – Cyprus criminalizes Armenian genocide denial.

November 
 7 November – The University of Sydney's Australian Archaeological Mission, excavating at a UNESCO World Heritage Site on the southwestern coast of the country, discover the islands oldest theatre. Located in the ancient city of Nea Paphos (capital of Cyprus at the time), it is a Hellenistic-Roman structure believed to have been in use for about six and a half centuries, from c. 300 B.C. until its final destruction in the earthquakes of A.D. 365. The Roman columns are made of granite from quarries in Troad, Turkey.
 20 November – Cyprus offers France the use of its airbase facilities to bomb the Islamic State of Iraq and the Levant in Syria. Cypriot airbases are already being used by British and Canadian air forces for military operations.
 24 November – A bomb blast at the Hellenic Business Federation offices in central Athens, Greece, damages the Cypriot Embassy across the street. While there is yet no claim for responsibility the authorities suspect a domestic guerrilla group set off the blast.

December 
 3 December – Four Tornado GR4 fighter jets, operating out of RAF Akrotiri on Cyprus, successfully bomb ISIL-controlled oil wells in eastern Syria.

Deaths

References

 
Years of the 21st century in Cyprus
Cyprus
Cyprus
2010s in Cyprus
Cyprus